Mexican visas are documents issued by the National Migration Institute, dependent on the Secretariat of the Interior, with the stated goal of regulating and facilitating migratory flows.

A foreign national wishing to enter Mexico must obtain a visa unless they are a citizen of one of the 68 eligible visa-exempt countries or one of the three Electronic Authorization System eligible countries.

All visitors entering by land should obtain a document Forma Migratoria Multiple to present at checkpoints within the country. In 2016 Mexico has introduced the electronic version of the form (Forma Migratoria Múltiple Electrónica, or FMME) which can be obtained online at a price of US$40.

Visa policy map

Visa exemption 

Nationals of the following 65 countries and jurisdictions holding normal passports do not require a visa to enter Mexico as tourists, visitors in transit or business visitors. Tourists and business visitors can stay in Mexico for up to 180 days. Visitors in transit can stay for up to 30 days.

Notes:
  Including residents of French overseas departments and territories, Danish territories and Dutch Caribbean territories.
  For British nationals, only holders of British citizen, British National (Overseas), British Overseas Territory Bermudan and British Virgin Islands Passport Holders, and British subject passports are eligible for visa-free entry. Including permanent residents or valid visa holders of the United Kingdom.
  Including permanent residents or valid visa holders of countries that comprise the Schengen area.
  Including citizens of Australia and New Zealand residing in Australian territories and New Zealand territories.
  Including holders of Permanent Resident Cards or valid visas issued by Canada.
  Including holders of permanent residence permits issued by Chile.
  Including holders of permanent residence permits issued by Colombia.
  Including holders of Permanent Residence Card, Permanent Re-entry Permit or valid visas issued by Japan.
  Including holders of permanent residence permits issued by Peru.
  Including holders of valid US visas or Green Cards.

Substitute visa 

Nationals of any countries for which there is a visa requirement are exempt from it if they have any of the following:

 Valid visa for:

 Any of the countries that make up the Schengen area

 Permanent residence of:

 Any of the countries that make up the Schengen area

Note: temporary residence permits for Schengen countries are not accepted. Residence permits must be permanent.

Electronic Authorization System 

The Electronic Authorization System (Sistema de Autorización Electrónica, SAE) is an online system, which allows citizens of the eligible countries travelling by air to obtain an electronic authorization to travel to Mexico for transit, tourism or business purposes without a consular visa. It is valid for 30 days and a single entry. Upon arrival, visitors are authorized to stay in Mexico as tourists for up to 180 days. SAE does not apply to travelers entering Mexico by land or sea, or those who are travelling on a non-participating airline, and they must hold a valid Mexican visa or an applicable visa issued by a third country.

Eligible countries are:

Transit without a visa 

Passengers requiring a visa who are transiting in Mexico City can do so without a visa if their connection time does not exceed 24 hours and if their flight is nonstop, without intermediate stops within Mexican territory. They are escorted to the transit hall of the Mexico City International Airport in the custody of an agent of the National Immigration Service who holds passports and/or travel documents until the passenger boards the connecting flight.

Non-ordinary passports 

Holders of diplomatic or service category passports issued by Algeria, Antigua and Barbuda, Armenia, Barbados, Bolivia, China, Cuba, Guatemala, Guyana, India, Indonesia, Kazakhstan, Laos, Malaysia, Mongolia, Morocco, Pakistan, Philippines, Russia, Saint Lucia, Saint Vincent and the Grenadines, Serbia, Thailand, Tunisia, United Arab Emirates, United States and of diplomatic passports only of issued by Andorra, Austria, Azerbaijan, Belgium, Benin, Czech Republic, Denmark, Dominican Republic, Ecuador, El Salvador, Ethiopia, Finland, Honduras,  Hungary, Kuwait, Lithuania, Marshall Islands, Micronesia, Netherlands, Norway, Palau, Portugal, Slovakia, South Africa, Trinidad and Tobago, Turkey, Ukraine, Uruguay do not require a visa.

Holders of diplomatic or service category passports of Australia, Bahamas, Liechtenstein, Malta, Monaco and San Marino require a visa. Holders of non-Diplomatic special passports issued by the United States require a visa.

APEC Business Travel Card 

Holders of passports issued by the following countries who possess an APEC Business Travel Card (ABTC) containing the "MEX" code on the reverse that it is valid for travel to Mexico can enter visa-free for business trips for up to 90 days.

ABTCs are issued to nationals of:

Entry stamps

Controversy 
A 2017 report commissioned by the Instituto Nacional de Migración argued that migrants from Guatemala, Honduras and El Salvador were subjected to physical, verbal and sexual abuse in its detention centers, including solitary confinement, death threats and unwanted sexual contact.

By the beginning of the decade of 2020’s, the National Migration Institute of Mexico has become controversial for being one of the countries that refuses entry specially to citizens from Ecuador, Venezuela, Brazil, Colombia and Central Americans; fighting against irregular immigration to the United States, there have been several statements about the inhumane conditions that they keep inadmissible people, breaking their human rights.

In December 2019, an Ecuadorian singer and Composer Ricardo Pita traveled to Yucatan via Cancun to join a trova Contest and was returned to his country, alleging that Mexico has the sovereign right not to admit a foreigner to its territory; The Ecuadorian Ministry of International Relations regrets that the Mexican immigration authorities denied him access to the country and took him “to a 70-meter room where he was questioned about his visit for around 30 hours", without granting him the right to contact the Consulate or be fully informed about the reason for the rejection, Ecuador maintains that its citizen "does not have migratory alerts, nor is he persecuted by the Ecuadorian justice" and that he is a well-known musician.

In 2019 the Brazilian consul for Mexico  spoke out about the inhumane treatments in the Cancun International Airport and Mexico City International Airport, and about the travelers who complains about poor food during detention, and about not giving the right to give a call to the consulate, rights given in the Vienna Convention on Consular Relations

The Colombian chancellery in 2021 also spoke about Colombians who had suffered human rights violations in Mexico, and the chancellor Claudia Blum sent a letter to the chancellor of Mexico regarding concern about the repeated non-admissions of Colombians arriving in Mexico, in 2019 5,935 Colombians were not allowed to enter Mexican territory, while in 2020 with Colombia being closed for 7 months because of the COVID-19 pandemic, 3,721 Colombians where inadmissible in the 5 months remaining.
In October 2019, a 17-year old autistic child was selected to join a drawing competition in Mexico City, and arriving into Mexico he was interviewed by some people who, according to the minor, were yelling at him and telling him that he was not welcome in their country. They took away his cell phone, his drawing book and put him in a room that the minor describes as a prison. , an interview by Colombian newspaper Semana describes that arriving into Mexico is like "landing in hell".

In November 2021, Mexico cancelled visa-free access to citizens from Brazil, Ecuador and Venezuela

See also 

 Visa requirements for Mexican citizens
 Foreign relations of Mexico

References

External links 
 Countries and territories that do not require a visa for Mexico
 Electronic Visa Authorization
 List of countries that require a visa for Mexico
 Forma Migratoria Múltiple (FMM)

Mexico
Foreign relations of Mexico
Mexican immigration law